Modec was an electric vehicle manufacturer in Coventry, in the United Kingdom, specialising in Commercial vehicles in the N2 category. It unveiled its first model in April 2006 and announced its intention to commence series production in March 2007, with the first production vehicles destined for Tesco. Following a long-term decline in sales, it entered administration in March 2011, with all remaining assets and intellectual property sold to Navistar International.

History
 2002  eMercury project commenced within London Taxis International (a subsidiary of Manganese Bronze Holdings).  The project was led by Jevon Thorpe, designer of the TX1London Taxi.  Some development funding received from the Energy Savings Trust (EST), part of the Department of Trade and Industry.

 2004 Three eMercury prototypes demonstrated - one conventional lead-acid battery powered, one hybrid vehicle utilising a nickel metal hydride battery and one utilising a high energy molten salt battery mounted in a removable cassette between the chassis rails.
 Manganese Bronze Holdings announces its decision to focus on its taxi business. The eMercury project bought by Jamie Borwick, former CEO & Chairman of Manganese Bronze, who creates Modec Limited as part of Borwick Group.
 Splits with drivetrain supplier Azure Dynamics, in favour of Zytek, commences development of production vehicles

 2006  Announces partnerships with Lex Logistics for customer service, GE Commercial Finance for vehicle finance and battery rental and Axeon Power for battery cassette assemblies containing Zebra battery technology.
 Unveils next generation of production intent vehicles at SMMT Commercial Vehicle Show.  Fitted with an 85 kWh battery pack, they have a 2-2.5 tonne payload, a governed top speed of 50 mph and a range in excess of 100 miles on a typical urban duty cycle.  Maximum torque of 300 Newton metres is delivered from rest, resulting in lively acceleration. Zebra batteries are used.

 2007 Coventry production facility officially opened by the Rt Hon David Cameron MP.
 Announcement of that the first vehicles built will be delivered to Tesco for home grocery deliveries.
 Other deliveries included Center Parcs at their Elveden Forest park for servicing use, Accord, Amey, Speedy Hire, Hildon Water, London Borough of Islington and others.

 2008 100th Modec vehicle produced, production at the Coventry plant ramping up according to plan (maximum capacity 5,000 vehicles per annum).
 London dealer network expands to six sites; Distributors appointed in the Netherlands and Ireland
 UPS has ordered Modec electric vans for its UK and German fleets. Energy costs play a huge part in the potential profitability of package delivery companies like UPS, DHL and FedEx.

 2009 Modec is the first electric vehicle in the N2 class to attain European Whole Vehicle Type Approval. Modec has entered into a joint venture with Navistar International for North and South America. The Joint venture is named Navistar-Modec EV Alliance.

 2010 Navistar began deliveries of its eStar electric van manufactured in Wakarusa, Indiana, under licensed technology from Modec's zero-emissions delivery van.

Closure
Following a long-term decline in sales with a total production of around 400 vehicles, and following the failure of a rescue deal with Navistar, Modec entered administration in March 2011 with debts of over £40m. Navistar subsequently bought the intellectual property rights from administrators Zolfo Cooper.

Following the closure of the business and sale of the assets, Liberty Electric Cars hired the entire Modec engineering team and set up a new subsidiary "Liberty E-Tech". After failing in January 2011 to agree a deal with Navistar to buy the brand, in July 2011 Liberty launched a service called "e-Care" to service and maintain Modec vehicles, which presently covers the UK, France, Germany and Dubai.

Technical
The only product of the Modec company was the Modec EV commercial vehicle. It was produced in three versions; a chassis cab, box van and a dropside. The Modec has a kerb weight of 3.3 tonnes and a max gross capacity of 6.05 tonnes.

It has a  range and a  top speed.

See also 
 Battery electric vehicle
 Electric vehicle
 Smith Electric Vehicles

References

External links

Modec Limited 
Interview with Lord Jamie Borwick with Financial Times 
Interview with Lord Jamie Borwick at REAL BUSINESS about Modec 
Video of Robert Llewellyn driving the van from Brighton to London as part of an eco-rally

Navistar International
Electric trucks
Battery electric vehicle manufacturers
Electric vehicle manufacturers of the United Kingdom
Defunct truck manufacturers of the United Kingdom
Coventry motor companies
Vehicle manufacturing companies established in 2004
Vehicle manufacturing companies disestablished in 2011